Robert Frederick Perrett (23 November 1919 – 1994) was an English professional footballer, who played for Bournemouth & Boscombe Athletic, Huddersfield Town and Southampton.

Playing career
Perrett was born in Bournemouth and started his career with Bournemouth & Boscombe Athletic in  1937, before moving to join Huddersfield for the 1938–39 season, making only one appearance.

He returned to the south coast to join Southampton in time for the 1939–40 season and played in all three of "Saints" matches before the season was abandoned upon the outbreak of World War II. In the few matches he played (at outside left) it was reported that he "combined well" with Ted Bates on his inside.

He made a further 18 appearances in wartime matches (with four goals).

References

1919 births
Footballers from Bournemouth
1994 deaths
English footballers
Association football midfielders
English Football League players
AFC Bournemouth players
Huddersfield Town A.F.C. players
Southampton F.C. players
Southampton F.C. wartime guest players